The South African cricket team was touring West Indies from 19 May to 30 June 2010. The tour consisted of two Twenty20s (T20), five One Day Internationals (ODIs) and three Tests.

The fifth ODI and the first Test, as well as a tour match, was scheduled to be played at Sabina Park in Kingston, Jamaica, but due to the 2010 Kingston unrest, these were moved to Port of Spain.

T20I series

1st T20I

2nd T20I

ODI series

1st ODI

2nd ODI

3rd ODI

4th ODI

5th ODI

Test series

1st Test

2nd Test

3rd Test

Notes 

2010 in South African cricket
International cricket competitions in 2010
2010
West Indian cricket seasons from 2000–01
2010 in West Indian cricket